Lena Rea later Lena McAleese  (born c. 1940) is a former Irish badminton player.

Biography
Lena Rea won her first national title in Ireland in 1959, winning the mixed competition with Kenneth Carlisle. In 1960 and 1961 she defended the title. In 1961, Rea won the Irish Open for the first time. Another title followed there in 1973 with Barbara Beckett.

Achievements

References

1940s births
Living people
Irish female badminton players